Dabbler is natural media drawing software for beginners. It was initially developed by Fractal Design Corporation. It is a simplified version of Fractal Design Painter, and included multimedia tutorials and a fullscreen interface. Dabbler was released as "Art Dabbler" after the MetaCreations merger, and rights were eventually transferred to Corel. Dabbler operating system is Mac OS, and Microsoft Windows.

See also
Corel Painter

External links
 Bloomberg overview of Fractal Design Corporation
 Dabbler 2
 Art Dabbler

Graphics software
Corel software